This is a list of films banned in Malaysia, as they are viewed by the Malaysian government for violating relevant laws and regulations, or because of other political and religious factors. Films that are assigned the Tidak Diluluskan Untuk Tayangan ("Not Passed for Screening") category by the Film Censorship Board of Malaysia are banned for sale, possession, distribution and screening. Screening rejected films, possessing, selling, or even owning them in private is forbidden and strictly enforced and can be punished with severe fines, up to 20 years' imprisonment or both.

List

The Walt Disney Company

Walt Disney Pictures

Pixar Animation Studios

Marvel Studios

20th Century Studios

See also
List of banned films
Cinema of Malaysia
Film censorship in Malaysia

References

External links 

 Films banned in Malaysia at IMDb

 Banned
Malaysia
 Banned